Lizzie Andrew Borden (July 19, 1860 – June 1, 1927) was an American woman tried and acquitted of the August 4, 1892 axe murders of her father and stepmother in Fall River, Massachusetts. No one else was charged in the murders, and despite ostracism from other residents, Borden spent the remainder of her life in Fall River. She died of pneumonia at age 66, just days before the death of her older sister, Emma.

The Borden murders and trial received widespread publicity throughout the United States, and along with Borden herself, they remain a topic in American popular culture to the present day. They have been depicted in numerous films, theatrical productions, literary works, and folk rhymes and are still very well-known in the Fall River area.

Early life

Lizzie Andrew Borden was born July 19, 1860, in Fall River, Massachusetts, to Sarah Anthony Borden (née Morse; 1823–1863) and Andrew Jackson Borden (1822–1892). Her father, who was of English and Welsh descent, grew up in very modest surroundings and struggled financially as a young man, despite being the descendant of wealthy and influential local residents. Andrew eventually prospered in the manufacture and sale of furniture and caskets, then became a successful property developer. He was a director of several textile mills and owned considerable commercial property; he was also president of the Union Savings Bank and a director of the Durfee Safe Deposit and Trust Co. At his death, his estate was valued at $300,000 ( and $9,630,000 in 2022).

Despite his wealth, Andrew was known for his frugality. For instance, the Borden home lacked indoor plumbing although, at the time, it was a common accommodation for the wealthy. It was in an affluent area, but the wealthiest residents of Fall River, including Andrew's cousins, generally lived in the more fashionable neighborhood, "The Hill", which was farther from the industrial areas of the city.

Borden and her older sister, Emma Lenora Borden (1851–1927), had a relatively religious upbringing and attended Central Congregational Church. As a young woman, Lizzie was very involved in church activities, including teaching Sunday school to children of recent immigrants to the United States. She was involved in religious organizations, such as the Christian Endeavor Society, for which she served as secretary-treasurer, and contemporary social movements, such as the Woman's Christian Temperance Union. She was also a member of the Ladies' Fruit and Flower Mission.

Three years after the death of Lizzie's mother, Sarah, Andrew married Abby Durfee Gray (1828–1892). Lizzie stated that she called her stepmother "Mrs. Borden" and demurred on whether they had a cordial relationship; she believed that Abby had married her father for his wealth. Bridget Sullivan (whom they called Maggie), the Bordens' 25-year-old live-in maid, who had immigrated to the U.S. from Ireland, testified that Lizzie and Emma rarely ate meals with their parents. In May 1892, Andrew killed multiple pigeons in his barn with a hatchet, believing they were attracting local children to hunt them. Lizzie had recently built a roost for the pigeons, and it has been commonly recounted that she was upset over his killing of them, though the veracity of this has been disputed. A family argument in July 1892 prompted both sisters to take extended "vacations" in New Bedford. After returning to Fall River, a week before the murders, Lizzie chose to stay in a local rooming house for four days before returning to the family residence.

Tension had been growing within the Borden family in the months before the murders, especially over Andrew's gifts of real estate to various branches of Abby's family. After their stepmother's sister received a house, the sisters demanded and received a rental property (the home they had lived in until their mother died), which they purchased from their father for $1; a few weeks before the murders, they sold the property back to their father for $5,000. The night before the murders, John Vinnicum Morse, the brother of Lizzie and Emma's deceased mother, visited and was invited to stay for a few days to discuss business matters with his brother-in-law, Andrew. Some writers have speculated that their conversation, particularly about property transfer, may have aggravated an already tense situation.
For several days before the murders, the entire household had been violently ill. A family friend later speculated that mutton left on the stove to use in meals over several days was the cause, but Abby had feared poison, given that Andrew had not been a popular man.

Murders

August 4, 1892

John Morse arrived in the evening of August 3 and slept in the guest room that night. After breakfast the next morning, at which Andrew, Abby, Lizzie, John, and the Bordens' maid Bridget "Maggie" Sullivan, were present, Andrew and John went to the sitting room, where they chatted for nearly an hour. Morse left around 8:48  to buy a pair of oxen and visit his niece in Fall River, planning to return to the Borden home for lunch at noon. Andrew left for his morning walk sometime after 9 .

Although the cleaning of the guest room was one of Lizzie and Emma's regular chores, Abby went upstairs sometime between 9:00  and 10:30  to make the bed. According to the forensic investigation, Abby was facing her killer at the time of the attack. She was first struck on the side of the head with a hatchet, which cut her just above the ear, causing her to turn and fall face down on the floor, creating contusions on her nose and forehead. Her killer then struck her multiple times, delivering 17 more direct hits to the back of her head, killing her.

When Andrew returned at around 10:30 , his key failed to open the door, so he knocked. Sullivan went to unlock the door; finding it jammed, she uttered a curse. She would later testify that she heard Lizzie laughing immediately after this; she did not see Lizzie, but stated that the laughter was coming from the top of the stairs. This was considered significant as Abby was already dead by this time, and her body would have been visible to anyone on the home's second floor. Lizzie later denied being upstairs and testified that her father had asked her where Abby was, to which she replied that a messenger had delivered Abby a summons to visit a sick friend.

Sullivan stated that she had then removed Andrew's boots and helped him into his slippers before he lay down on the sofa for a nap (a detail contradicted by the crime-scene photos, which show Andrew wearing boots). Sullivan then informed Lizzie of a department store sale, Lizzie said Sullivan was welcome to come along with her, but Sullivan felt unwell and went to take a nap in her bedroom instead.

Sullivan testified that she was in her third-floor room, resting from cleaning windows, when just before 11:10  she heard Lizzie call from downstairs, "Maggie, come quick! Father's dead. Somebody came in and killed him." Andrew was slumped on a couch in the downstairs sitting room, struck 10 or 11 times with a hatchet-like weapon. One of his eyes had been split cleanly in two, suggesting that he had been asleep when attacked. His still-bleeding wounds suggested a very recent attack. Dr. Bowen, the family's physician, arrived from his home across the street and pronounced both victims dead. Detectives estimated that Andrew's death had occurred at approximately 11:00

Investigation
Lizzie Borden's initial answers to the police officers' questions were at times strange and contradictory. Initially she reported hearing a groan, or a scraping noise, or a distress call, before entering the house. Two hours later she told police she had heard nothing and entered the house not realizing that anything was wrong. When asked where her stepmother was, she recounted Abby receiving a note asking her to visit a sick friend. She also stated that she thought Abby had returned and asked if someone could go upstairs and look for her. Sullivan and a neighbor, Mrs. Churchill, were half-way up the stairs, their eyes level with the floor, when they looked into the guest room and saw Abby lying face down on the floor.

Most of the officers who interviewed Borden reported that they disliked her attitude; some said she was too calm and poised. Despite her "attitude" and changing alibis, she was not checked for bloodstains. Police did search her room, but it was a cursory inspection; at the trial they admitted to not doing a proper search because Borden was not feeling well. They were subsequently criticized for their lack of diligence.

In the basement, police found two hatchets, two axes, and a hatchet-head with a broken handle. The hatchet-head was suspected of being the murder weapon as the break in the handle appeared fresh and the ash and dust on the head, unlike that on the other bladed tools, appeared to have been deliberately applied to make it look as if it had been in the basement for some time. However, none of these tools were removed from the house. Because of the mysterious illness that had stricken the household before the murders, the family's milk and Andrew's and Abby's stomachs (removed during autopsies performed in the Borden dining room) were tested for poison; none was found. Residents suspected Lizzie of purchasing 'hydrocyanic acid in a diluted form' from the local drugstore. Her defense was that she inquired about the acid in order to clean her furs (despite the local medical examiner's testimony that it did not have antiseptic properties).

Lizzie and Emma's friend, Alice Russell, decided to stay with them the night following the murders while Morse spent the night in the attic guest room (contrary to later accounts that he slept in the murder-site guest room). Police were stationed around the house on the night of August 4, during which an officer said he had seen Borden enter the cellar with Russell, carrying a kerosene lamp and a slop pail. He stated he saw both women exit the cellar, after which Borden returned alone; though he was unable to see what she was doing, he stated it appeared she was bent over the sink.

On August 5, Morse left the house and was mobbed by hundreds of people; police had to escort him back to the house. On August 6, police conducted a more thorough search of the house, inspecting the sisters' clothing and confiscating the broken-handled hatchet-head. That evening a police officer and the mayor visited the Bordens, and Lizzie was informed that she was a suspect in the murders. The next morning, Russell entered the kitchen to find Borden tearing up a dress. She explained that she was planning to put it on the fire because it was covered in paint. It was never determined whether it was the dress she had been wearing on the day of the murders.

Inquest
Borden appeared at the inquest hearing on August 8. Her request to have her family attorney present was refused under a state statute providing that an inquest must be held in private. She had been prescribed regular doses of morphine to calm her nerves, and it is possible that her testimony was affected by this. Her behavior was erratic, and she often refused to answer a question even if the answer would be beneficial to her. She often contradicted herself and provided alternating accounts of the morning in question, such as saying she was in the kitchen reading a magazine when her father arrived home, then saying she was in the dining room doing some ironing, and then saying she was coming down the stairs. She also said she removed her father's boots and put slippers on him, while police photographs clearly showed him still wearing his boots.

The district attorney was very aggressive and confrontational. On August 11, Borden was served with a warrant of arrest and jailed. The inquest testimony, the basis for the modern debate regarding her guilt or innocence, was later ruled inadmissible at her trial in June 1893. Contemporaneous newspaper articles noted that Borden possessed a "stolid demeanor" and "bit her lips, flushed, and bent toward attorney Adams;" it was also reported that the testimony provided in the inquest had "caused a change of opinion among her friends who have heretofore strongly maintained her innocence." The inquest received significant press attention nationwide, including an extensive three-page write-up in The Boston Globe. A grand jury began hearing evidence on November 7, and Borden was indicted on December 2.

Trial and acquittal

Borden's trial took place in New Bedford starting on June 5, 1893. Prosecuting attorneys were Hosea M. Knowlton and future United States Supreme Court Justice William H. Moody; defending were Andrew V. Jennings, Melvin O. Adams, and former Massachusetts governor George D. Robinson. Five days before the trial's commencement, on June 1, another axe murder occurred in Fall River. This time the victim was Bertha Manchester, who was found hacked to death in her kitchen. The similarities between the Manchester and Bordens' murders were striking and noted by jurors. However, Jose Correa de Mello, a Portuguese immigrant, was later convicted of Manchester's murder in 1894, and was determined not to have been in the vicinity of Fall River at the time of the Borden murders.

A prominent point of discussion in the trial (or press coverage of it) was the hatchet-head found in the basement, which was not convincingly demonstrated by the prosecution to be the murder weapon. Prosecutors argued that the killer had removed the handle because it would have been covered in blood. One officer testified that a hatchet handle was found near the hatchet-head, but another officer contradicted this. Though no bloody clothing was found at the scene, Russell testified that on August 8, 1892, she had witnessed Borden burn a dress in the kitchen stove, saying it had been ruined when she brushed against wet paint. During the course of the trial, defense never attempted to challenge this statement.

Lizzie Borden's presence at the home was also a point of dispute during the trial; according to testimony, Sullivan entered the second floor of the home at around 10:58  and left Lizzie and her father downstairs. Lizzie told several people that at this time, she went into the barn and was not in the house for "20 minutes or possibly a half an hour". Hyman Lubinsky testified for the defense that he saw Lizzie Borden leaving the barn at 11:03  and Charles Gardner confirmed the time. At 11:10 , Lizzie called Sullivan downstairs, told her Andrew had been murdered, and ordered her not to enter the room; instead, Borden sent her to get a doctor.

Both victims' heads had been removed during autopsy and the skulls were admitted as evidence during the trial and presented on June 5, 1893. Upon seeing them in the courtroom, Borden fainted. Evidence was excluded that Borden had sought to purchase prussic acid (hydrogen cyanide) purportedly for cleaning a sealskin cloak, from a local druggist on the day before the murders. The judge ruled that the incident was too remote in time to have any connection.

The presiding Associate Justice, Justin Dewey (who had been appointed by Robinson when he was governor), delivered a lengthy summary that supported the defense as his charge to the jury before it was sent to deliberate on June 20, 1893. After an hour and a half of deliberation, the jury acquitted Borden of the murders. Upon exiting the courthouse, she told reporters she was "the happiest woman in the world".

The trial has been compared to the later trials of Bruno Hauptmann, Ethel and Julius Rosenberg, and O.J. Simpson, as a landmark in publicity and public interest in the history of American legal proceedings.

Speculation
Although acquitted at trial, Borden remained the prime suspect in her father's and stepmother's murders. Writer Victoria Lincoln proposed in 1967 that Borden might have committed the murders while in a fugue state. Another prominent suggestion was that she was physically and sexually abused by her father, which drove her to kill him. There is little evidence to support this, but incest is not a topic that would have been discussed at the time, and the methods for collecting physical evidence would have been quite different in 1892. This belief was intimated in local papers at the time of the murders, and was revisited by scholar Marcia Carlisle in a 1992 essay.

Mystery author Evan Hunter, in his 1984 novel Lizzie, suggested that Borden committed the murders after being caught in a tryst with Sullivan. McBain elaborated on his speculation in a 1999 interview, speculating that Abby had caught Lizzie and Sullivan together and had reacted with horror and disgust, and that Lizzie had killed Abby with a candlestick. When Andrew returned she had confessed to him, but killed him in a rage with a hatchet when he reacted exactly as Abby had. McBain further speculates that Sullivan disposed of the hatchet somewhere afterwards. In her later years, Borden was rumored to be homosexual, but there was no such speculation about Sullivan, who found other employment after the murders and later married a man she met while working as a maid in Butte, Montana. She died in Butte in 1948, where she allegedly gave a death-bed confession to her sister, stating that she had changed her testimony on the stand in order to protect Borden.

Another significant suspect is John Morse, Lizzie's maternal uncle, who rarely met with the family after his sister died, but had slept in the house the night before the murders; according to law enforcement, Morse had provided an "absurdly perfect and over-detailed alibi for the death of Abby Borden". He was considered a suspect by police for a period.

Others noted as potential suspects in the crimes include Sullivan, possibly in retaliation for being ordered to clean the windows on a hot day; the day of the murders was unusually hot – and at the time she was still recovering from the mystery illness that had struck the household. A man named William Borden, suspected to be Andrew's illegitimate son, was noted as a possible suspect by writer Arnold Brown, who surmised in his book Lizzie Borden: The legend, the truth, the final chapter that William had tried and failed to extort money from his father. However, author Leonard Rebello did extensive research on William Borden in Brown's book and was able to prove he was not Andrew Borden's son.

Later life
After the trial, the Borden sisters moved into a large, modern house in The Hill neighborhood in Fall River. Around this time, Lizzie began using the name Lizbeth A. Borden. At their new house, which Lizbeth dubbed "Maplecroft", they had a staff that included live-in maids, a housekeeper, and a coachman. Because Abby was ruled to have died before Andrew, her estate went first to Andrew and then, at his death, passed to his daughters as part of his estate. A considerable settlement, however, was paid to settle claims by Abby's family.

Despite the acquittal, Borden was ostracized by Fall River society. Her name was again brought into the public eye when she was accused of shoplifting in 1897 in Providence, Rhode Island. In 1905, shortly after an argument over a party that Lizbeth had given for actress Nance O'Neil, Emma moved out of the house and never saw her sister again.

Death
Borden was ill in her last year following the removal of her gallbladder; she died of pneumonia on June 1, 1927, in Fall River. Funeral details were not published and few attended. Nine days later, Emma died from chronic nephritis at the age of 76 in a nursing home in Newmarket, New Hampshire, having moved to this location in 1923 both for health reasons and to avoid renewed attention following the publication of another book about the murders. The sisters, neither of whom had ever married, were buried side by side in the family plot in Oak Grove Cemetery.

At the time of her death, Borden was worth over $250,000. She owned a house on the corner of French Street and Belmont Street, several office buildings, shares in several utilities, two cars and a large amount of jewelry. She left $30,000 to the Fall River Animal Rescue League and $500 ($ in ) in trust for perpetual care of her father's grave. Her closest friend and a cousin each received $6,000 ($ today)—substantial sums at the time of the estate's distribution in 1927—and numerous friends and family members each received between $1,000 ($ in ) and $5,000 ($ in ).

In culture
Scholar Ann Schofield notes that "Borden's story has tended to take one or the other of two fictional forms: the tragic romance and the feminist quest ...  As the story of Lizzie Borden has been created and re-created through rhyme and fiction it has taken on the qualities of a popular American myth or legend that effectively links the present to the past."

The Borden house is now a museum, and operates a bed and breakfast with 1890s styling. Pieces of evidence used in the trial, including the axehead, are preserved at the Fall River Historical Society.

Folkrhyme
The case was memorialized in a popular skipping-rope rhyme, sung to the tune of the then-popular song "Ta-ra-ra Boom-de-ay."

Folklore says that the rhyme was made up by an anonymous writer as a tune to sell newspapers. Others attribute it to the ubiquitous, but anonymous, "Mother Goose".

In reality, Borden's stepmother suffered 18 or 19 blows; her father suffered 11 blows.

The rhyme has a less well-known second verse:

Depictions

Borden has been depicted in music, radio, film, theater, and television, often in association with the murders of which she was acquitted.

Among the earlier portrayals on stage was John Colton and Carleton Miles's 1933 play Nine Pine Street, in which Lillian Gish played Effie Holden, a character who is based on Borden. The play was not a success and ran for only 28 performances. In 1947 Lillian de la Torre wrote a one-act play, Goodbye, Miss Lizzie Borden.

Other retellings include New Faces of 1952, a 1952 Broadway musical with a number titled "Lizzie Borden" which depicts the crimes, as well as Agnes De Mille's ballet Fall River Legend (1948) and the Jack Beeson opera Lizzie Borden (1965), both works being based on Borden and the murders of her father and stepmother. Other plays based on Borden include Blood Relations (1980), a Canadian production written by Sharon Pollock that recounts events leading up to the murders, which was made into a television movie in Calgary. Lizzie Borden, another musical adaptation, was also made starring Tony nominee Alison Fraser.

Carmen Matthews played Lizzie Borden in the Alfred Hitchcock Presents season 1 episode "The Older Sister", with Joan Lorring as Emma and Hitchcock's daughter Pat as the servant Margaret. The episode aired on January 22, 1956, and takes place in 1893, with a determined woman reporter trying to interview the sisters one year after the murders and end with the revelation that Emma committed the murders.

A March 24, 1957, episode of Omnibus presented two different adaptations of the Lizzie Borden story: the first a play, "The Trial of Lizzie Borden", with Katharine Bard as Lizzie; the second a production of the Fall River Legend ballet with Nora Kaye as "The Accused". In 1959, The Legend of Lizzie by Reginald Lawrence attracted praise for Anne Meacham in the title role, but still closed after just two performances.

The folk singing group The Chad Mitchell Trio recorded the black comedy song "Lizzie Borden" for its live 1961 album Mighty Day on Campus. Released as a single, it reached #44 on the Billboard Hot 100 chart in 1962.

The rock musical, Lizzie, is a retelling of the Borden murders following Lizzie in the days leading up to the murder and then trial. It features music by Steven Cheslik-deMeyer and Alan Stevens Hewitt, lyrics by Cheslik-deMeyer and Tim Maner, and a book by Maner.

ABC commissioned The Legend of Lizzie Borden (1975), a television film starring Elizabeth Montgomery as Lizzie Borden, Katherine Helmond as Emma Borden, and Fionnula Flanagan as Bridget Sullivan; it was later discovered after Montgomery died that she and Borden were in fact sixth cousins once removed, both descending from 17th century Massachusetts resident John Luther. Rhonda McClure, the genealogist who documented the Montgomery-Borden connection, said: "I wonder how Elizabeth would have felt if she knew she was playing her own cousin."

Lifetime produced Lizzie Borden Took an Ax (2014), a speculative television film with Christina Ricci portraying Borden, which was followed by The Lizzie Borden Chronicles (2015), a limited series and a sequel to the television film which presents a fictionalized account of Borden's life after the trial. A feature film, Lizzie (2018), with Chloë Sevigny as Borden and Kristen Stewart as Bridget Sullivan, depicts a lesbian tryst between Borden and Sullivan which leads to the murders.

In 2015, Supernatural aired an episode entitled "Thin Lizzie". In the episode, Sam (Jared Padalecki) and Dean Winchester (Jensen Ackles) investigate the "Lizzie Borden house" after several people are murdered with an ax. They originally suspect that the ghost of Lizzie Borden is the one who is responsible for the murders, but they then discover that she isn't the murderer.

The events of the murders and the trial, with actors portraying the people who were involved in them, have been reenacted on a number of documentary programs. In 1936, the radio program Unsolved Mysteries broadcast a 15 minute dramatization titled "The Lizzie Borden Case", which presented a possible scenario in which the murders were committed during a botched robbery attempt by a tramp, who then escaped. Television recreations have included episodes of Biography, Second Verdict, History's Mysteries, Case Reopened (1999), and Mysteries Decoded (2019). The Lizzie Borden case was partly dramatized on an episode of the 2022 BBC Radio podcast series Lucy Worsley's Lady Killers.

In literature
Borden has been depicted in several literary works, including:
"The Fall River Axe Murders", a short story by Angela Carter, was published in her collection Black Venus (1985).
Another Borden-inspired story by Carter was "Lizzie's Tiger", in which Borden, imagined as a four-year-old, has an extraordinary encounter at the circus. The story was published in 1993 (posthumously) in the collection American Ghosts and Old World Wonders.
Miss Lizzie, a 1989 novel by Walter Satterthwait, takes place thirty years after the murders and recounts an unlikely friendship between Borden and a child, and the suspicions that arise from a murder.
Australian author Sarah Schmidt's 2017 novel See What I Have Done tells the story of the murders and their aftermath from the points of view of Lizzie and Emma Borden, Bridget Sullivan, and an imagined stranger. It won the MUD Literary Prize for a debut novel.
In Agatha Christie's novel Sleeping Murder, the main character Miss Marple says that murder "was not proven in the case of Madeleine Smith and Lizzie was acquittedbut many people believe both of those women were guilty."

See also
 A. J. Borden Building
 Corky Row Historic District
 List of unsolved murders

Notes

References

Works cited

 
 
 
 
 
 
 
 
 
 
 
 
 King, Florence. WASP, Where is Thy Sting? Chapter 15, "One WASP's Family, or the Ties That Bind." Stein & Day, 1977,  (1990 Reprint Edition).
 
 
 Masterton, William L. Lizzie Didn't Do It! Boston: Branden Publishing Company, 2000, .
 
 
 
 Pearson, Edmund Lester. Studies in Murder Ohio State University Press, 1924.
 
 
 
 Radin, Edward D. Lizzie Borden: The Untold Story Simon and Schuster, 1961.

Further reading
 Asher, Robert, Lawrence B. Goodheart and Alan Rogers. Murder on Trial: 1620–2002 New York: State University of New York Press, 2005, .
 Davidson, Avram. "The Deed of the Deft-Footed Dragon" in several collections, most recently The Other Nineteenth Century, ed. Grania Davis and Henry Wessels. New York; TOR, 2001.
 de Mille, Agnes. Lizzie Borden: A Dance of Death. Boston: Little, Brown and Co., 1968.
 Martins, Michael and Dennis Binette. Parallel Lives: A Social History of Lizzie A. Borden and Her Fall River. Fall River: Fall River Historical Society, 2011. 1,138 pages with much previously unavailable information including letters written by Lizzie Borden while in jail and photographs of her in later life.  Parallel Lives Official Website
 Robertson, Cara. The Trial of Lizzie Borden. New York: Simon and Schuster, 2019. 
 Sullivan, Robert. Goodbye Lizzie Borden. Brattleboro, VT: Stephen Greene Press, 1974. .
 Jordan, Jim d, "The Fall River Murders and the Trial of Lizzie Borden Vols. I & II. https://www.amazon.com/Fall-River-Murders-Lizzie-Borden/dp/B08XN9G96F/ref=tmm_pap_swatch_0?_encoding=UTF8&qid=&sr=Vol. I, https://www.amazon.com/Fall-River-Murders-Lizzie-Borden/dp/B08XN7J1TZ/ref=tmm_pap_swatch_0?_encoding=UTF8&qid=&sr= Vol. II

External links

 
 The Lizzie Andrew Borden Virtual Museum & Library
 Tattered Fabric: Fall River's Lizzie Borden
 The Fall River Tragedy: A History of the Borden Murders  (1893), full text detailing crimes
 Lizzie Borden Moot Court, with tribunal made up of U.S. Supreme Court justices and Stanford University Law School professors. September 16, 1997

1860 births
1927 deaths
1892 crimes in the United States
19th-century American women
20th-century American women
American folklore
American people of English descent
American people of Welsh descent
Axe murder
Cornell family
Deaths from pneumonia in Massachusetts
People acquitted of murder
People from Fall River, Massachusetts
Woman's Christian Temperance Union people